The Canada women's national American football team is the official American football senior national team of Canada.

History 
Canada debuted at the first IFAF Women's World Championship in 2010. They advanced to the championship game and received the silver medal after losing to the United States in the championship game. They competed at the 2013 championship, again advancing to the championship. They again where they finished second after losing to the United States 64–0.

IFAF Women's World Championship record

References

See also 

Canada men's national football team

Women's national American football teams
American football in Canada
American football
2010 establishments in Canada
American football teams established in 2010
National sports teams established in 2010